The electoral district of Rosewood was a Legislative Assembly electorate in the state of Queensland, Australia.

History
Rosewood was created in the 1878 Electoral Districts Act, taking effect at the 1878 colonial election, and existed until the 1932 state election. It was based on the part of West Moreton west of Ipswich.

When Rosewood was abolished in 1932, it was incorporated again into the district of West Moreton.

Members

The following people were elected in the seat of Rosewood:

References

Former electoral districts of Queensland
1878 establishments in Australia
1932 disestablishments in Australia
Constituencies established in 1878
Constituencies disestablished in 1932